Guillermo Luis Ortiz (born 9 August 1992) is an Argentine professional footballer who plays as a centre-back for Newell's old boys]].

Career
Ortiz's first club of his career was Newell's Old Boys. After coming through the youth ranks at the club, he made his first-team debut on 29 November 2011 in a Copa Argentina match against Patronato. His league debut came on 9 March 2012 versus Colón. He went onto make thirty-nine appearances for Newell's in his next four seasons. On 16 January 2015, Ortiz joined Aldosivi of the Argentine Primera División on loan. He made his bow for Aldosivi on 17 March in the league against Belgrano, prior to scoring the first goal of his career in August versus San Martín. In total, Ortiz played thirty-five times before returning to Newell's.

In July 2016, Ortiz joined Primera División side Colón on loan. His debut for Colón was on 30 August against his former club, Aldosivi. In total, he went onto make twenty-seven league appearances for the club. He joined permanently at the end of his loan spell. Ortiz remained with Colón for three further seasons, before departing in January 2020 to Atlético Tucumán.

Career statistics
.

Honours
Newell's Old Boys
Argentine Primera División: 2012–13 Torneo Final

References

External links

1992 births
Living people
Footballers from Rosario, Santa Fe
Argentine footballers
Association football defenders
Argentine Primera División players
Newell's Old Boys footballers
Aldosivi footballers
Club Atlético Colón footballers
Atlético Tucumán footballers
Godoy Cruz Antonio Tomba footballers